Hotel Institute Montreux (HIM), founded in 1984, is a for-profit, private hotel school located in Montreux, Switzerland that provides an education for students wanting to gain an education in the hospitality industry. The school offers a bachelor's degree program in Business Administration in Hospitality Management with options to specialize in Financial Analysis & Wealth Management, Human Capital & Development, Management for the Senior Living Industry, Luxury Brand Management, and Franchise Business Management.

The school is located in Montreux in the French-speaking region of Switzerland. The campus is housed across three buildings—Hotel Europe, Leman Residence, and The Freddie Mercury.

History
Hotel Institute Montreux was founded in 1984 and later acquired by the hospitality education network—Swiss Education Group—in 2002. As part of Swiss Education Group, Hotel Institute Montreux is currently owned by the Hong Kong-based investment management company, Summer Capital, since 2018.

Programs
Hotel Institute Montreux offers a Bachelor of Business Administration in Hospitality Management (with specialization)

Specializations include:
 Luxury Brand Management, 
 Financial Analysis and Wealth Management
 Human Capital and Development
 Management for the Senior Living Industry
 Franchise Business Management
The bachelor's degree program is awarded in partnership with Northwood University (USA).

Rankings
In the 2021 ranking of the British higher education consultant Quacquarelli Symonds, the institute improved from 24th in 2020 to 6th place in an international ranking for hotel management schools.

See also
 Swiss Hotel Management School
 Cesar Ritz Colleges
 International Hotel and Tourism Training Institute

References

Educational institutions established in 1984
1984 establishments in Switzerland
Hospitality schools in Switzerland